L. Adrienne Cupples (born Laura Adrienne Sherrill; 1944/1945 – January 13, 2022) was a professor of epidemiology and biostatistics at the Boston University School of Public Health.

Early life and education
Cupples was born to Rev. Shirley Sherrill and his wife, Mary Lea Sherrill. She studied history and American studies at Raymond College, part of the University of the Pacific (United States) in Stockton, California before earning a masters and doctorate in statistics from Boston University.

Academic career
Cupples worked as a researcher on the Framingham Heart Study for over 35 years, eventually becoming the Co-Principal Investigator and a highly-cited researchers according to webometrics.

Selected publications

References

External links
 

1940s births
20th-century births
2022 deaths
American women epidemiologists
American epidemiologists
Biostatisticians
Boston University School of Public Health faculty
Date of birth missing
Place of birth missing
Place of death missing
University of the Pacific (United States) alumni
Boston University alumni